The 1996 Ibero-American Championships in Athletics (Spanish: VII Campeonato Iberoamericano de Atletismo) was the seventh edition of the international athletics competition between Ibero-American nations which was held at the Estadio Alfonso Galvis Duque in Medellín, Colombia from 9–12 May.

The competition was held at an altitude of 1480 metres above sea level, which served to raise performances in most athletic events, bar the long-distance running contests. Eleven championships records were improved during the three-day competition which comprised 42 events; there were 22 men's events and 20 women's events (with equal programmes bar the men's steeplechase and pole vault). Two national records were broken at the event: Costa Rica's Alex Foster beat the 110 metres hurdles record, while decathlon runner-up Alejandro Cárdenas set a Mexican record of 7614 points.

Cuba sent a full strength delegation and won almost half the events, taking twenty golds and 41 medals overall. Cuban gold medallists included high jumper Javier Sotomayor, 800 metres runners Ana Fidelia Quirot and Norberto Téllez, and hurdler Anier García. Boosted by the absence of Spain, Brazil came second in the medal tally, winning 31 medals in total – eight of which were gold. The hosts Colombia performed well in the long-distance events and women's sprints and ended the competition third overall with six golds in their haul of twenty medals.

Chile's Sebastián Keitel was one of the foremost athletes at the event as he claimed a 100/200 metres double against Brazilian and Cuban opposition. His compatriot Gert Weil won the fifth Ibero-American gold medal in the shot put. María Eugenia Villamizar of Colombia won her second straight hammer throw title in a championship record. Her team mate Felipa Palacios broke the women's 200 m record with her winning time of 22.93 seconds.

The other record breakers were principally Cuban: Yamilé Aldama improved the triple jump mark, Alberto Manzano set a new pole vault standard, while throwers Alberto Sánchez and Isbel Luaces beat the previous records in the hammer and javelin throw, respectively. The closest contest of the competition was the women's 400 metres as Julia Duporty edged Ximena Restrepo by three hundredths of a second. Restrepo later took the Colombian women to the gold in the 4×400 metres relay, while Duporty's Cuban team were disqualified.

Medal summary

Men

Women

Medal table

†Note: The medal count from the 2010 Ibero-American Championships report is incorrect as it did not include the shared high jump bronze medals of the Dominican Republic's Juana Arrendel and Marcos dos Santos of Brazil.

Participation
Out of the 23 members of the Asociación Iberoamericana de Atletismo at that point in time, 19 nations sent delegations to the championships. The most notable absences were Spain and Uruguay. Despite the fact that the competition was held in the Americas, Nicaragua and Honduras did not send teams.

 (1)
 (22)
 (5)
 (60)
 (10)
 (56)
 (9)
 (65)
 (9)
 (2)
 (9)
 (37)
 (2)
 (1)
 (7)
 (10)
 (25)
 (1)
 (8)

References

Results
Ibero American Championships. GBR Athletics. Retrieved on 2012-01-04.
El Atletismo Ibero-Americano - San Fernando 2010 (pgs. 141-150). RFEA. Retrieved on 2012-01-04.

Ibero-American Championships in Athletics
Ibero-American Championships
1996 in Colombian sport
International athletics competitions hosted by Colombia
Sport in Medellín
May 1996 sports events in South America